Maria Loja (1890–1953) was a German stage and film actress.

Selected filmography
 What Am I Without You (1934)
 Adventure on the Southern Express (1934)
 The Grand Duke's Finances (1934)
 What Am I Without You (1934)
 Make Me Happy (1935)
 I Was Jack Mortimer (1935)
 Augustus the Strong (1936)
 Don't Promise Me Anything (1937)
 Men Without a Fatherland (1937)
 The Grey Lady (1937)
 The Life and Loves of Tschaikovsky (1939)
 Men Are That Way (1939)
 Her First Experience (1939)
 A Salzburg Comedy (1943)
 Romance in a Minor Key (1943)
 The Buchholz Family (1944)
 Journey to Happiness (1948)
 The Spendthrift (1953)

References

Bibliography 
 Giesen, Rolf.  Nazi Propaganda Films: A History and Filmography. McFarland, 2003.

External links 
 

1890 births
1953 deaths
Actresses from Hamburg
German film actresses
German stage actresses